Robiul Hoque (born 4 January 1997) is a Bangladeshi cricketer. He made his first-class debut for Central Zone in the 2018–19 Bangladesh Cricket League on 21 November 2018. He made his List A debut on 15 March 2022, for Prime Bank Cricket Club in the 2021–22 Dhaka Premier Division Cricket League.

References

External links
 

1998 births
Living people
Bangladeshi cricketers
Bangladesh Central Zone cricketers
Prime Bank Cricket Club cricketers
People from Rangpur District